Comberiate Glacier is a glacier flowing west from the Royal Society Range between Berry Spur and Utz Spur. It was named by the Advisory Committee on Antarctic Names (1994) after Michael A. Comberiate, who was instrumental in developing a system for satellite communications to and within Antarctica, the South Pole Satellite Data Link (SPSDL).
This system uniquely used scientific polar-orbiting satellites not intended for communications, but visible to the South Pole every 100 minutes or so. No geostationary communication satellites could see beyond 81 degrees South, so there were no conventional alternatives.  This system included the first steerable satellite antenna at the Pole (90S) and another at McMurdo near the coast (77.8S x 167.4E). These antenna tracked every pass of several polar-orbiting satellites and sent data to each other on the satellite's ranging channel, during the windows of co-visibility.  The system in McMurdo had a separate link to the continental USA via geostationary communications satellites.
 
SPSDL operated routinely for about a decade; starting on December 19, 1984.

SPSDL was a pathfinder for use of steerable antennas in the antarctic, for communications and for launch and on-orbit support.

References
 

Glaciers of Victoria Land
Scott Coast